Gareth Williams may refer to:

Arts and entertainment 
 Gareth Williams (British musician) (1953–2001), member of English group This Heat
 Gareth F. Williams (1955–2016), Welsh novelist and television writer
 Gareth Williams (composer) (born 1977), Irish composer
 Gareth Williams (New Zealand actor) (born 1987), New Zealand television, film and theater actor
 Gareth Williams (actor) (fl. 1990s), American actor

Sports

Association football (soccer) 
 Gareth Williams (footballer, born 1941) (1941–2018), English-born Welsh footballer
 Gareth Williams (footballer, born 1967), English footballer
 Gareth Williams (footballer, born 1981), Scottish footballer
 Gareth Williams (footballer, born 1982), South African-born Welsh footballer

Rugby
 Gareth Williams (rugby union, born 1954) (1954–2018), Wales and British Lions international rugby union player
 Gareth Williams (rugby union, born 1978), Wales international rugby union hooker
 Gareth Williams (rugby union, born 1988), Welsh rugby union scrum-half

Other sports
 Gareth Williams (cricketer) (born 1973), English cricketer
 Gareth Williams (tennis), South African tennis player

Others
 Gareth Williams, Baron Williams of Mostyn (1941–2003), Welsh barrister and Labour politician
 Gareth V. Williams (born 1965), English-American astronomer at the Minor Planet Center
 Gareth Wyn Williams (1978–2010), Welsh mathematician, employee of Britain's GCHQ signals intelligence agency, found dead in 2010
 Gareth Williams (Latin Americanist) (fl. 1990s), Latin Americanist, member of Latin American subaltern studies group

See also 
 Garth Williams
 Gary Williams (disambiguation)